Joachim Juhl Rothmann (born 29 June 2000) is a Danish professional footballer who plays as a forward for Danish 1st Division club HB Køge.

Club career

FC Nordsjælland
Rothmann began playing in the youth of KFUM Roskilde before moving to Greve Fodbold. He came to the academy of FC Nordsjælland at the age of 12 from Greve.

Rothmann's first senior experience was on 25 November 2018, where he sat on the bench for the whole game against OB in the Danish Superliga. He got his debut for FC Nordsjælland on 5 December 2018. Rothmann started on the bench, but replaced Mads Valentin in the 55th minute in a 0-1 defeat against Vendsyssel FF in the Danish Cup. He got his debut in the Danish Superliga five days later against AGF, where he played 17 minutes in a 1-0 victory. On 9 January 2019, Rothmann signed his first professional contract and would become a permanent part of the first team from the summer of 2019.

On 12 May 2021 Nordsjælland confirmed, that Rothmann had signed a new deal until June 2022 and immediately would be loaned out to Norwegian Eliteserien club Tromsø IL for the rest of 2021. However, after a disappointing time at Tromsø, the loan spell was cut short, after Nordsjælland decided to recall him on 10 August 2021. At Tromsø, Rothmann only managed to play 98 minutes, spread over seven games.

On 29 August 2021, one year before his contract with Nordsjælland expired, Rothmann was once again sent out on loan, this time to Danish 1st Division club HB Køge for the rest of the season. The following day, he scored on his debut for Køge against Vendsyssel FF.

Permanent move to Køge
After a season on loan at Køge, scoring 4 goals in 24 matches, Rothmann completed a permanent move to HB Køge on 16 June 2022, signing a three-year deal with the club.

References

External links
 
 Joachim Rothmann at DBU 
 Joachim Rothmann at HB Køge

2000 births
Living people
Danish men's footballers
Danish expatriate men's footballers
Denmark youth international footballers
Association football forwards
People from Roskilde
Danish Superliga players
KFUM Roskilde players
Greve Fodbold players
FC Nordsjælland players
HB Køge players
Danish expatriate sportspeople in Norway
Expatriate footballers in Norway
Sportspeople from Region Zealand